Clarke Central High School (CCHS) is located in Athens, Georgia, United States. In 1970, Clarke County schools were desegregated, and the high school for black children, Burney-Harris High School (formerly Athens High and Industrial School), and the high school for white children, Athens High, merged to establish Clarke Central. Classes in the newly formed school began in 1971.

CCHS is in the Clarke County School District and is one of two traditional high schools in the county; the other is Cedar Shoals High School. The two schools have a rivalry known as the Classic City Championship. The Clarke County School District is also home to a third, non-traditional high school, Classic City High.

Located in the heart of the city, CCHS's original building opened in 1952. Since then, the school has seen several renovations and additions. A modern three-story classroom and lab addition opened in 2006. Other improvements include a new gymnasium, theater, and food court.

As of 2022, the school is on a four-period block schedule with students completing eight credits per year and four per semester.

Academics
Clarke Central High School's success in improving students' SAT scores earned the school the regional Governor's Cup in 2006 and 2007. The governor's office presents the award each year to Georgia schools that achieve the greatest gains in average SAT scores.

In 2010, U.S. News & World Report awarded Clarke Central the Silver Medal and ranked the school in the top 3% of high schools nationwide and in the top 11 in the state of Georgia. Newsweek named CCHS one of America's Best Schools and placed it in the 96th percentile of high schools nationwide.

In 2012, Clarke Central was named an AP Science, Technology, Electronics, and Mathematics Honor School by the Georgia Department of Education. It was ranked in the top 11% of high schools nationwide by the Washington Posts High School Challenge.

In 2013, Clarke Central Principal Dr. Robbie P. Hooker was named the Georgia Principal of the Year by the NSSPC.

Athletics
Athletics teams at Clarke Central High School are known as the Gladiators.

Sports offered include cheerleading, cross country, football, fast-pitch softball, volleyball, basketball, swimming and diving, wrestling, baseball, golf, soccer, tennis, and track. Most of Clarke Central's sports are represented by men's and women's teams.

Coach Billy Henderson, one of the most successful coaches in Georgia High School history, coached the Gladiators from the 1970's through 1995.  Henderson's final record with Clarke Central was 222-65-1 and he had an overall record of 285-107-15 .Henderson received the Atlanta Falcons Lifetime Achievement Award.[9] He made eighteen straight play-off appearances and ended his head coaching career with three state football championships, three baseball championships, and one swimming championship.[1]: 121 
The former head football coach, Ahren Self, played defensive back for the Citadel from 1991 the 1994. There he was voted "Most Outstanding Defensive Back" following his senior year. In 1992, he was selected as Southern Conference Defensive Player of the Week, as well as South Carolina Defensive Player of the Week.  Coach Self was also a member of the team that upset Division I-A Arkansas and won the Southern Conference Championship in 1992.

In 2010, the Gladiators captured the Region 8-AAAA Championship and finished the regular season 10-0. In 2009, the team finished 8-2 in the regular season, appeared in the final round of the state football tournament, and finished #2 in the AP poll.

In 2018, The CCHS Women's Cross Country won their first Region Championships in school history led by sophomore Samantha Brodrick who broke her mother's 24-year-old school record in the 5k. Along with Sam, Junior Lucy Yeomans, and Lena Cook a freshmen powerhouse helped lead their team to this historical moment in Glad Athletics  

In 2021, The Gladiator men's cross country team won the Region 8-AAAAA Championship, Led by Sophomore Beck Wolf-Hardy and Junior Max Carlson.

Clarke Central's football team is currently coached by former University of Georgia baseball coach David Perno.

State championship titles

Student life

Fine arts organizations

The school has award-winning band, orchestra, drama, and chorus programs.

Literary organizations

The school's yearbook, the Gladius, is an all-color annual, published by Lifetouch.

The school's literary-art magazine, the iliad, and the school's newsmagazine, the ODYSSEY, have won gold medals from the Columbia Scholastic Press Association, and top honors from the University of Georgia's Georgia Scholastic Press Association, the National Scholastic Press Association, the Southern Interscholastic Press Association, and the Quill and Scroll Honor Society.

Occupational organizations

Student organizations

Demographics

American Indian/Alaskan Native - 0%
Asian - 2%
Black or African American - 52%
Hispanic - 35%
Multi-Racial - 3%
Native Hawaiian/Other Pacific Islander - 0%
White/Caucasian - 12%

Student body population - 1,376

These statistics were current as of August 18, 2014.

Notable alumni

 Kim Basinger - 1972, actress
 Paul Broun - 1963, Republican Congressman from Georgia from 2007-2015.
 Frank Bush - 1981, linebackers coach for the Atlanta Falcons, former linebacker for the Houston Oilers
 Eve Carson - 2004, slain Student Body President of the University of North Carolina-Chapel Hill
 Derek Dooley - 1986, offensive analyst for the Alabama Crimson Tide
 Jason Farris Brown - 1987, country music artist and former professional golfer
 Eva Cohn Galambos - 1944, first mayor of Sandy Springs, Georgia
 Willie Green - 1986, former wide receiver for the NFL Denver Broncos
 John Kasay - 1987, former NFL kicker
 Brian Kemp - 1982, Georgia State Senator (2002–2006), Secretary of State (2010–2018), Governor of Georgia (2019–present) 
 Todd Kimsey - 1980, actor (Seinfeld, The Perfect Storm)
 Horace King - 1971, former running back for the NFL Detroit Lions
 Nene Leakes - 1985, born Linnethia Monique Johnson, reality show star, The Real Housewives of Atlanta
 Phaedra Parks - 1990, entertainment attorney, reality show star, The Real Housewives of Atlanta
 Logan Smalley - 2001, director of Darius Goes West
 Chuck Smith - 1988, retired NFL defensive end and former defensive line coach at the University of Tennessee
 Keith Strickland - 1972, musician; B-52's drummer, bass player, and guitarist
 Fran Tarkenton - 1957, NFL Hall of Fame quarterback
 Dunta Robinson - 2000, former NFL cornerback
 Darius Weems - 2008, subject of the documentary Darius Goes West
 Ricky Wilson - 1971, musician, former B-52's guitarist (died 1985)

References

External links
Clarke Central High School
Clarke Central High School Gladiators
Odyssey Newsmagazine
Athens High and Industrial School historical marker

Public high schools in Georgia (U.S. state)
Educational institutions established in 1970
Schools in Clarke County, Georgia
Buildings and structures in Athens, Georgia
1971 establishments in Georgia (U.S. state)